A Dark Machine is the second studio album by Australian producer ShockOne. Warner Music Australia and Canadian record label Monstercat released the album on 1 August 2019.

Background
The album was announced through a tweet from Monstercat. The first single through the label, "Run" featuring Italian electronic music act The Bloody Beetroots, was released on 27 June 2019. A music video for the single was released on the same day.

The fifth single, "Til Dawn", was released on 18 July 2019.

Tour
A nationwide tour through Australia was announced by ShockOne on 5 June 2019.

Tour dates

Track listing

Charts

References

2019 albums
Warner Music Australasia albums
Monstercat albums